Meechok Marhasaranukun is a Thai professional footballer who plays for Thai club Lampang (on loan from Port F.C.) as a right back.

International career
He won the 2015 AFF U-19 Youth Championship with Thailand U19.
In 2020, He played the 2020 AFC U-23 Championship with Thailand U23.

Honours

International
Thailand U-19
AFF U-19 Youth Championship (1): 2015

References

External links

1997 births
Living people
Meechok Marhasaranukun
Meechok Marhasaranukun
Association football fullbacks
Meechok Marhasaranukun
Meechok Marhasaranukun
Meechok Marhasaranukun
Meechok Marhasaranukun
Meechok Marhasaranukun
Meechok Marhasaranukun